René Lacaille is a Réunionnais accordionist, currently based in France. He was born into a musical family and taught himself to play the accordion at age 7 while on tour with his father. He has been described as a neo-traditionalist and plays in the séga style among others.

Discography

Aster (1996)
Patanpo (1999)
Digdig (2002)
Mapou (2004)
Cordéon Kaméléon (2009)
Poksina (2011)
Fanfaroné (2014)
Gatir (2015)

References

External links
Artist's website (in French)
Artist's website at MySpace.com (in French)
René Lacaille's music agency page
René Lacaille on culturebase.net

Living people
Réunionnaise accordionists
African accordionists
1946 births
21st-century accordionists